Hoa Murk is a populated place situated in Pima County, Arizona, United States. In the O'odham language, Hoa Murk means Basket Burned, by which it is also known. Other names it has been known by include Hoa Muerta, Pozo Ben, and Romaines Field. Hoa Murk became the official name as a result of a Board on Geographic Names decision in 1941.

References

Populated places in Pima County, Arizona